Shagada is a rural locality (a selo) in Khasavyurtovsky District, Republic of Dagestan, Russia. The population was 877 as of 2010. There are 13 streets.

Geography 
Shagada is located 35 km north of Khasavyurt (the district's administrative centre) by road. Kutan Butush is the nearest rural locality.

References 

Rural localities in Khasavyurtovsky District